Domenico "Mimmo" Schiattarella (born 17 November 1967) is an Italian racing driver.  He participated in 7 Formula One Grands Prix for Simtek, debuting on October 16, 1994, and finishing when the team folded the next year.  He scored no championship points, with a best finish of 9th in the 1995 Argentine Grand Prix. He has also participated in several CART races, Le Mans Series and American Le Mans Series events.

Motorsports career results

Formula One
(key)

American Open Wheel
(key)

CART

Le Mans 24 Hours results

Complete International Superstars Series/EuroV8 Series results
(key) (Races in bold indicate pole position) (Races in italics indicate fastest lap)

NASCAR
(key) (Bold – Pole position awarded by qualifying time. Italics – Pole position earned by points standings or practice time. * – Most laps led.)

Whelen Euro Series - Elite 1

External links
Profile on F1 Rejects
Official Website of Domenico Schiattarella

1967 births
Living people
Racing drivers from Milan
Italian Formula One drivers
Simtek Formula One drivers
Champ Car drivers
Atlantic Championship drivers
24 Hours of Le Mans drivers
American Le Mans Series drivers
Superstars Series drivers
NASCAR drivers
Prema Powerteam drivers